Maheshi N. Ramasamy is a British-Sri Lankan physician and lecturer. She is currently working as one of the chief investigators at the Oxford Vaccine Group.

Biography 
Maheshi Ramasamy was born in Sri Lanka to a Tamil father and Sinhalese mother. Her father Ranjan Ramasamy was a prominent Tamil scientist in Sri Lanka and her mother Samaranayake Ramasamy was also a renowned Sinhala scientist.

Career 
Maheshi completed her medical education in the UK. She obtained her medical degree at the Christ's College, Cambridge and became a trainee in Infectious Diseases and General Internal Medicine in London and Oxford. She also obtained the DPhil from the Wadham College, Oxford.

She is currently serving as a consultant physician at the NHS foundation trust, Oxford University and also working as an honorary senior clinical lecturer at the Magdalen College, University of Oxford.

She is currently regarded as one of the frontline scientists among the Oxford Vaccine Group in attempting to develop a vaccine to treat the patients affected by the COVID-19.

She was mentioned and accredited in one of the articles published by popular medical journal The Lancet regarding the clinical procedure of the vaccine which is currently under the development stage.

References 

21st-century Sri Lankan women
Alumni of Christ's College, Cambridge
Alumni of Wadham College, Oxford
21st-century British medical doctors
British women academics
British infectious disease physicians
Living people
Sri Lankan infectious disease physicians
Sri Lankan Tamil women
Sri Lankan women academics
Year of birth missing (living people)
Sri Lankan emigrants to the United Kingdom
Sinhalese physicians